Thomas Henry Kingsnorth (16 April 1917 – 2 February 1992) was an English footballer. He played professionally for  Gillingham between 1946 and 1951, and in total made 28 appearances in the Football League.

References

1917 births
1992 deaths
English footballers
Gillingham F.C. players
People from Sittingbourne
Association footballers not categorized by position